Sir Thomas Leigh (c. 1504 – 15 November 1571) was an English merchant and Lord Mayor of London in 1558-59. He served as a City Alderman from 1552 until 1571.

Life

Leigh was born about 1504 at Wellington, Shropshire to Roger Leigh (died 1506) and Anne née Trafford. 

He was the 2nd great-grandson of Sir Piers Leigh, who was wounded at the Battle of Agincourt in 1415, whose family was a cadet branch of the ancient Leighs, of West Hall, High Legh, Cheshire.

Leigh was raised by Sir Rowland Hill, a City mercer and wool merchant, and later joined Sir Rowland's business, and circa 1535, he married his niece and heir, Alice Barker, daughter of John Barker and Elizabeth née Hill. 

The following year he was appointed a Justice of the Peace for Shropshire. 

Leigh, who served three times as Master of the Mercers' Company, also served as Sheriff of London (1555–56) and in 1558 became Lord Mayor of London. 

He was also a merchant of the Staple and a member of the Merchant Adventurers' Company.

In 1558, after the death of Mary I of England, Leigh led the coronation procession of Elizabeth I of England. 

In 1559, he was knighted by Queen Elizabeth.

Residence 
In 1561, Sir Rowland Hill purchased Stoneleigh Abbey after the Dissolution of the Monasteries for his ward Sir Thomas Leigh, and a mansion was built on the site of the former monastic buildings. Leigh's family and descendants were seated on the estate from 1561 to 1993.

Family

Sir Thomas Leigh's descendants include Jane Austen through her mother Cassandra Leigh, the Leigh baronets and the Barons Leigh of Stoneleigh, the Earls of Chichester and the Duchess of Dudley.

One of his daughters, Winifred Leigh, married a later Lord Mayor of London, George Bond.  

Another, Katherine Leigh, married Edward Baber MP, Serjeant-at-law and Recorder of Bath.

See also 
 Leigh baronets
 Baron Leigh
 Earl of Chichester
 Duchess of Dudley

References

1500s births
1571 deaths
Year of birth uncertain
Businesspeople from Shropshire
People from Warwickshire
People from Wellington, Shropshire
English justices of the peace
English merchants
Knights Bachelor
English knights
Merchants of the Staple
Councilmen and Aldermen of the City of London
Sheriffs of the City of London
16th-century lord mayors of London
16th-century English businesspeople